Jacques Dupuis may refer to:
 Jacques Dupuis (Jesuit) (1923–2004), Belgian Jesuit priest
 Jacques Dupuis (politician) (b. 1948), member of the National Assembly of Quebec
  (1830–1870) Belgian violinist and composer
  (1914–1984)